Ci Kaengan (Cikaengan; Sundanese "Ci" means "river", so the whole name means "Kaengan River"; also written as “Ci Kaingan”) is a river in the island of Java, Indonesia, that flows mainly in the Garut Regency of West Java province, about 210 km to the southeast of the capital Jakarta.

The river flows from the Mount Cikuray and discharges into the Indian Ocean at the Cikaengan Beach of Garut Regency, at the border to the Tasikmalaya Regency. In 2016 two Microhydroelectric power stations were built utilizing this river producing about 12 megawatts of electricity.

The water debit is not quite large, but the water is relatively free from industrial pollution due to its situation in the traditional agricultural area. This led to the establishment of a river tubing attraction in the District of Banjarwangi.

Geography 
The river flows in the southwest area of Java with predominantly tropical rainforest climate (designated as Af in the Köppen-Geiger climate classification). The annual average temperature in the area is 23 °C. The warmest month is April, when the average temperature is around 24 °C, and the coldest is September, at 22 °C. The average annual rainfall is 3730 mm. The wettest month is December, with an average of 542 mm rainfall, and the driest is September, with 61 mm rainfall.

Watershed 
The watershed ( or DAS) Cikaengan together with Cilaki river form  the Southern Watershed Area of Garut Regency, as it flows to the south. The rivers in the area are generally short, narrow and with more valleys compared to the northern area (Cimanuk river flowing to the Sea of Java to the north).

Microhydroelectric Power Stations 
The flow that is seldom low during dry season makes the river useful to be developed into microhydroelectric renewable energy source, Two projects have been started by some companies: PT Petro Hidro Optima (PLTM Cikaengan 5,1 MW), and PT Cikaengan Tirta Energi (PLTM Cikaengan 2 dengan daya 7,2 MW).

Tourist attraction 
A part of the river is developed into “River Tubing Cikaengan” in the District of Banjarwangi, Garut Regency, since November 2016. The mid level difficulty of the river boarding class allows safe use for novices.

See also 
 List of rivers of Indonesia
 List of rivers of Java

References 

Rivers of West Java
Rivers of Indonesia